A chillum, or chilam, is a straight conical smoking pipe traditionally made of clay or a soft stone (Steatite or Catlinite). Examples of chillum were found in Pre-Columbian America, and it would evolve eventually into the "elbow-pipe". It was used popularly in India in the eighteenth century. A small stone is often used as a stopper in the stem. The style of pipe spread to Africa, and has been known in the Americas since the 1960s. A chillum pipe is used in Rastafari rituals.

Chillum stone
When smoking a chillum a chillum stone is often inserted in the pipe to keep from directly inhaling debris much like a screen or filter is used in other pipes. They are generally tight-fitting, conical with a flat top and usually have a small hole drilled down through the centre and slits down the sides to allow smoke to pass freely. Before they were commercially available people would search for the right size of pebble or stone to fit their pipes, a practice still followed by some.

According to Alfred Dunhill, Africans have long employed chillum-style pipes for smoking cannabis and later tobacco. Gourds and various horns were often employed while conical bowls were common in Uganda. One of the more famous pipes is an ivory cone pipe once belonging to Buganda monarch King Mtesa.

More recently, it has also seen use in sacraments by Rastafari.

Since the 1960s the embellished bamboo chillum has become an American folk art form. These pipes are handmade and often sold by artists on street corners in places like the Haight-Ashbury district of San Francisco and the Greenwich Village area of New York City. The designs on these contemporary smoking pipes recall traditional decorated bamboo pipes from Borneo,however, the American carved bamboo design often employs a brass lighting fixture for a bowl. Since the 1970s, street artist Darrel "Pipeman" Mortimer of San Francisco has made nearly 10,000 such pipes, each signed, numbered, and sold personally.

Rastafari ceremony
In "reasoning sessions" and grounations, the ritual chillum used is made of a cow's horn or conical wood piece, fitted with a long drawtube giving the smoke time to cool before inhalation.

Water chillum

A bong-like chillum equipped with a water filtration chamber is sometimes referred to as a chalice, based on a quote from the Biblical book of Deuteronomy. Thanks and praises are offered to Jah before smoking the chillum.

See also
 Spiritual use of cannabis
 Smoking pipe (non-tobacco)
 Hookah
 Bong
 One-hitter (smoking)

References

Indian culture
Cannabis smoking
Cannabis in India
Cannabis and religion
Drug paraphernalia
Pipe smoking
Tobacco in India
Desi culture